Aubrey Fitzgerald (1874–1968) was a British actor.

In 1909 he played El Tabloid in A Persian Princess at the Queen's Theatre in London.

Selected filmography
 One Arabian Night (1923)
 Little Miss Nobody (1923)
 Hutch Stirs 'em Up (1923)
 The Last Witness (1925)
 Nell Gwyn (1926)
 The King's Highway (1927)
 The Glad Eye (1927)
 Widecombe Fair (1928)
 Harmony Heaven (1930)
 The Great Gay Road (1931)
 Goodnight, Vienna (1932)
 Discord (1933)
 The Little Damozel (1933)
 Peg of Old Drury (1935)
  Squibs (1935)
 Chick (1936)
 Jury's Evidence (1936)
 When Knights Were Bold (1936)
 Song of the Forge (1937)
 Cross My Heart (1937)

References

External links

1874 births
1968 deaths
Male actors from London
English male film actors
20th-century English male actors